Altura is a city in Winona County, Minnesota, United States. The population was 493 at the 2010 census.

History
A post office called Altura has been in operation since 1891. The city was named after Altura, Spain.

Geography

Demographics

2010 census
As of the census of 2010, there were 493 people, 180 households, and 126 families living in the city. The racial makeup of the city was 96.6% White, 0.4% African American, 2.2% from other races, and 0.8% from two or more races. Hispanic or Latino of any race were 10.3% of the population.

There were 180 households, of which 37.8% had children under the age of 18 living with them, 57.2% were married couples living together, 4.4% had a female householder with no husband present, 8.3% had a male householder with no wife present, and 30.0% were non-families. 25.6% of all households were made up of individuals, and 8.9% had someone living alone who was 65 years of age or older. The average household size was 2.74 and the average family size was 3.27.

The median age in the city was 33.1 years. 30.2% of residents were under the age of 18; 8.3% were between the ages of 18 and 24; 29.4% were from 25 to 44; 20.2% were from 45 to 64; and 12% were 65 years of age or older. The gender makeup of the city was 55.6% male and 44.4% female.

2000 census
As of the census of 2000, there were 417 people, 163 households, and 117 families living in the city. The racial makeup of the city was 13.74% White, 87.6% Hispanic, 0.10% Asian, and 0.10% from two or more races. 

There were 163 households, out of which 36.2% had children under the age of 18 living with them, 61.3% were married couples living together, 6.7% had a female householder with no husband present, and 28.2% were non-families. 25.2% of all households were made up of individuals, and 11.0% had someone living alone who was 65 years of age or older. The average household size was 2.56 and the average family size was 3.06.

In the city, the population was spread out, with 28.8% under the age of 18, 7.9% from 18 to 24, 32.4% from 25 to 44, 15.6% from 45 to 64, and 15.3% who were 65 years of age or older. The median age was 32 years. For every 100 females, there were 120.6 males. For every 100 females age 18 and over, there were 106.3 males.

The median income for a household in the city was $38,393, and the median income for a family was $41,250. Males had a median income of $30,313 versus $23,125 for females. The per capita income for the city was $17,199. About 7.4% of families and 8.7% of the population were below the poverty line, including 8.8% of those under age 18 and 10.3% of those age 65 or over.

Notable person
George Henry Speltz, sixth Roman Catholic Bishop of the Roman Catholic Diocese of Saint Cloud

References

External links
 Altura Minnesota Community Guide

Cities in Minnesota
Cities in Winona County, Minnesota